Edward Rigg (born 5 December 1919 in Burnley, England) was an international speedway who finished twice finished seventh in the Speedway World Championship final.

Career summary
Rigg started his career with the Odsal Boomerangs, where he stayed for the following ten seasons. In 1957 he joined the Belle Vue Aces and won his only domestic team trophies, the Britannia Shield in 1957 and the National Trophy, at the end of his final season in 1958.

Rigg appeared for England on fourteen occasions.

Eddie Riggs Career Highlights

World Final Appearances
 1951 -  London, Wembley Stadium - 7th - 8pts
 1954 -  London, Wembley Stadium - 7th - 7pts

References 

1919 births
1991 deaths
British speedway riders
English motorcycle racers
Belle Vue Aces riders
Bradford Tudors riders
Sportspeople from Burnley